The Matheran Hill Railway (MHR) is a  narrow-gauge heritage railway in Maharashtra, India, which is administered by the Central Railway. The MHR is on the tentative list of UNESCO World Heritage Sites.

History
The Neral–Matheran Light Railway was built between 1901 and 1907 by Abdul Hussein Adamjee Peerbhoy and financed by his father, Sir Adamjee Peerbhoy, at a cost of Rupees 16,00,000. Adamjee Peerbhoy visited Matheran often, and wanted to build a railway to make it easier to get there. Hussain's plans for the Matheran Hill Railway were formulated in 1900, and construction began in 1904. The consulting engineer was Everard Calthrop. The line was open to traffic by 1907. Its tracks were originally  rails, but were upgraded to  rails.

The railway was closed because of flood damage in 2005 and was not expected to reopen before April 2007. However, the first run on the repaired railway was on 5 March 2007. The line observed its centenary on 15 April of that year. Service had been suspended during the monsoon season (from June to October) because of the danger of landslides. During the 2012 monsoon season, Central Railway (CR) tested the railway's air brakes and, after approval from the Commission of Railway Safety, ran the train during the monsoon for the first time. CR planned to shorten the monsoon service suspension to 15 July – 1 October.

In November 2012, CR added a special coach (known as a saloon) to trains operating on the line. The saloons have sofas and LCD screens showing images from outside the train. The saloons had been available only to railway officers.

Operator
The MHR and its assets, including the stations, line, and vehicles, belong to the government of India and are entrusted to the Ministry of Railways. Central Railway handles day-to-day maintenance and management, and several programs, divisions, and departments of Indian Railways are responsible for repairs.

Rolling stock

Steam locomotives

Consulting engineer Everard Calthrop designed the ML class  with Klien-Lindner axles to give a flexible wheelbase and four were supplied by Orenstein & Koppel. They ran from the railway's opening in 1907 until 1982, when they were replaced by diesel engines. By 1983, all steam locomotives were phased out. A B-class locomotive (#794) from the Darjeeling Himalayan Railway was transferred to the Neral–Matheran line in 2001 to test the feasibility of steam excursions. It was sent to the Golden Rock workshops for conversion to oil firing in 2013, and returned to Neral soon afterwards. Rail enthusiasts can once again enjoy and witness the 'steam-engine' on the Neral-Matheran toy train route. The steam engine will be fired either  by electric power or hydrogen.Railway Minister Ashwini Vaishnaw informed that electric and hydrogen propelled engine will be given the appearance of the old steam engine.

Diesel locomotives

Because of the line's sharp curves, only short-wheelbase four-wheel diesel units can be used; Class NDM1 and NDM6 locomotives are in use. Class NDM1 has two powered units, articulated with a central cab and initially developed by German builder Arn Jung. The non-articulated Class NDM6 was manufactured by the Bangalore builders SAN.

Route
Neral, the starting point, is near Mumbai. The  narrow-gauge line runs parallel to the broad-gauge line west of Hardal Hill before turning east to ascend towards Matheran. The rail and road meet near Jummapatti, and meet again after a brief separation at Bhekra Khud. After a short level stretch, there is a sharp ascent just before Mount Barry. A large horseshoe embankment was built to avoid a reversing station here. The line runs for a mile or so northwards around this before turning to take the One-Kiss Tunnel through the embankment.  Two more zig-zags through deep cuttings remain before Panorama Point is reached, and then the line bends back to Simpson's Tank and ends at Matheran. It takes about two hours and 20 minutes to complete the  journey, although CR plans to reduce this to one hour 30 minutes.

Stations
Neral: The Neral station is also on a  line from Mumbai to Bengaluru.
Jumapatti
Water Pipe: Used for filling steam locomotives
Aman Lodge: Named after a nearby lodge
: The hill terminus

See also
 Mountain railways of India

References

Notes

Bibliography

External links

Neral Matheran Light Railway – Photographs of 2005 monsoon damage
 International Working Steam
 Neral Matheran toy train’s track record 
 Aerial photo of the train
 Matheran Train Started Again

2 ft gauge railways in India
Mountain railways in India
Railway lines opened in 1907
Tourist attractions in Raigad district
World Heritage Tentative List for India